Murrieta  is a city in southwestern Riverside County, California, United States. The population of Murrieta was 110,949 as of the 2020 census. Murrieta experienced a 133.7% population increase between 2000 and 2010, making Murrieta one of the fastest-growing cities in the state during that period. Largely residential in character, Murrieta is typically characterized as a bedroom community. Murrieta is bordered by the city of Temecula to the south, the cities of Menifee and Wildomar to the north, and the unincorporated community of French Valley to the east. Murrieta is located in the center of the Los Angeles-San Diego mega-region. Murrieta is named for Juan Murrieta, a Californio ranchero who founded the town.

History
For most of its history, Murrieta was not heavily populated. On June 9, 1873, Domingo Pujol, Francisco Sanjurjo, and Juan and Ezequiel Murrieta purchased the Rancho Pauba and Rancho Temecula Mexican land grants, comprising  in the area. Ezequiel returned to Spain and turned the land over to his younger brother, Juan Murrieta (1844–1936), who brought 7,000 sheep to the valley in 1873, using the meadows to feed his sheep. The partnership dissolved in 1876 and Ezequiel and Juan Murrieta retained 15,000 acres of the northern half of the Temecula Rancho. Ezequiel and Juan Murrieta granted a right-of-way, one hundred feet wide to the California Southern Railroad through the Temecula Rancho on April 28, 1882 so that the railroad could be constructed through the valley.

In 1884, the Temecula Land and Water Company purchased about 14,500 acres from Juan Murrieta and mapped a townsite along the California Southern Railroad. Others discovered the valley after the construction of a depot in 1887 that connected Murrieta to the Southern California Railroad's transcontinental route. By 1890, some 800 people lived in Murrieta. Today much of the site (about 50 acres) is home to a Bible college and conference center, owned by Calvary Chapel Costa Mesa, which has invested millions of dollars into restoring and rebuilding the old resort rooms. When the trains stopped in 1935, tourists—the lifeblood of the town—were much harder to come by. The boom that Murrieta had experienced due to the train and the hot springs gradually died, leaving Murrieta as a small country town.

Although US Route 395 had passed through Murrieta, it was not until Interstate 15 was built in the early 1980s that another boom began to take hold. By the late 1980s, suburban neighborhoods were being constructed, and people began moving to the Murrieta area from cities and towns in San Diego and Orange Counties, as well as other parts of Riverside County.

In 1990, residents began a campaign for city status which resulted in the incorporation of the City of Murrieta on July 1, 1991. By then the population was 24,000, a major increase from 2,200 in 1980. Between 1991 and 2007, the city's population further increased to an estimated 97,257 residents, and  the city's population was 103,466, making it the largest city in southwestern Riverside County at that time.

In July 2014, Murrieta garnered national attention following days of citizen protests of detained immigrants.
Murrieta residents successfully blocked busloads of illegal immigrant detainees. They were en route to a temporary relocation and detention facility, which the federal government had planned to establish in the town.

Geography
Murrieta Creek runs southeasterly through the Murrieta Valley.

Climate

Murrieta has a Mediterranean climate or dry-summer subtropical (Köppen climate classification Csa). Murrieta has an average of 263 sunshine days and 35 days with measurable precipitation annually. The period of November through March is somewhat rainy. Murrieta gets on average 31 days a year of some type of precipitation. Murrieta averages  of precipitation annually, which mainly occurs during the winter and spring (November through April) with generally light rain showers, but sometimes heavy rainfall and thunderstorms. Snowfall is rare in the city basin, but nearby mountains slopes typically receive snowfall each winter.

Demographics

2010
The 2010 United States Census reported that Murrieta had a population of 103,466. The racial makeup of Murrieta was 72,137 (69.7%) White (55.7% non-Hispanic White), 5,601 (5.4%) African American, 741 (0.7%) Native American, 9,556 (9.2%) Asian, 391 (0.4%) Pacific Islander, 8,695 (8.4%) from other races, and 6,345 (6.1%) from two or more races. Hispanics or Latinos of any race were 26,792 persons (25.9%). The census reported 103,037 people (99.6% of the population) lived in households, 291 people (0.3%) lived in noninstitutionalized group quarters, and 138 people (0.1%) were institutionalized.

Of the 32,749 households, 48.4% had children under the age of 18 living in them, 62.8% were opposite-sex married couples living together, 3,814 (11.6%) had a female householder with no husband present, and 1,642 (5.0%) had a male householder with no wife present, with 1,626 (5.0%) unmarried opposite-sex partnerships and 192 (0.6%) same-sex married couples or partnerships. About 5,208 households (15.9%) were made up of individuals, and 2,248 (6.9%) had someone living alone who was 65 years of age or older. The average household size was 3.15. There were 26,033 families (79.5% of all households); the average family size was 3.51.

The population was distributed as 31,471 people (30.4%) under the age of 18, 9,891 people (9.6%) aged 18 to 24, 28,144 people (27.2%) aged 25 to 44, 23,555 people (22.8%) aged 45 to 64, and 10,405 people (10.1%) who were 65 years of age or older. The median age was 33.4 years. For every 100 females, there were 95.2 males. For every 100 females age 18 and over, there were 91.2 males.

The 35,294 housing units averaged 1,050.0 per square mile (405.4/km), of which 23,110 (70.6%) were owner-occupied and 9,639 (29.4%) were occupied by renters. The homeowner vacancy rate was 3.1%; the rental vacancy rate was 7.8%; 73,518 people (71.1% of the population) lived in owner-occupied housing units and 29,519 people (28.5%) lived in rental housing units.

2000
As of the census of 2000, 44,282 people, 14,320 households, and 11,699 families resided in the city. The 14,921 housing units averaged 525.6 per square mile (202.9/km). The racial makeup of the city was 81.6% White, 3.4% African American, 0.7% Native American, 4.0% Asian, 6.0% from other races, and 4.3% from two or more races. Hispanics or Latinos of any race were 17.5% of the population.

Of the 14,320 households, 47.5% had children under the age of 18 living with them, 70.2% were married couples living together, 8.1% had a female householder with no husband present, and 18.3% were not families. About 14.5% of all households were made up of individuals, and 6.7% had someone living alone who was 65 years of age or older. The average household size was 3.1 and the average family size was 3.4; 33.7% of the population of the city was under the age of 18, 6.4% were from 18 to 24, 30.8% were from 25 to 44, 17.6% were from 45 to 64, and 11.4% were 65 years of age or older. The median age was 34 years. For every 100 females, there were 96.1 males. For every 100 females age 18 and over, there were 92.7 males.

According to a 2007 estimate, the median income for a household in the city was $78,883, and the median income for a family was $90,930. Men had a median income of $49,107 versus $32,468 for women. The per capita income for the city was $23,290. About 3.0% of families and 4.3% of the population were below the poverty line, including 4.3% of those under age 18 and 5.4% of those age 65 or over.

Crime
Murrieta was the safest city in Riverside County in 2012, and in 2009, Murrieta was listed as the second-safest city (over 100,000 in population) in the United States, behind Irvine, California.

Economy

Top employers
According to the city's 2021 Comprehensive Annual Financial Report, the top non-military employers in the city are:

Arts and culture
The Town Square is the location of the Murrieta Police Department, Murrieta Public Library, City Hall, a senior center, and $2 million veterans memorial.

Parks and recreation
Bear Creek Golf and Country Club was designed by Jack Nicklaus, and Presidents Ronald Reagan and Gerald Ford have played there. The Golf Club at Rancho California was designed by Robert Trent Jones, Sr.

Government

In the United States Senate, California is represented by Democrats Dianne Feinstein and Alex Padilla.

In the Riverside County Board of Supervisors, Murrieta is in the Third District, represented by Chuck Washington.

Education
The city of Murrieta is served by the Murrieta Valley Unified School District (MVUSD). The district contains eleven elementary (K-5) schools, four middle (6-8) schools, three comprehensive high (9-12) schools (Murrieta Valley High School, Vista Murrieta High School, Murrieta Mesa High School), one continuation school (Creekside High School), and one independent study school.

Calvary Chapel Bible College operated at the Murrieta Hot Springs Resort site from 1994 until 2022. Its affiliated private comprehensive (K-9) school at Calvary Chapel Murrieta also serves the Murrieta community. There had been a senior high school in the Calvary Chapel Murrieta system, but it closed in 2019. Mt. San Jacinto College is the nearest community college (with locations in Temecula and Menifee) and the University of California, Riverside (UCR) is the nearest public university. The city is also home to a University of Phoenix learning center and an Azusa Pacific University satellite campus.

Media
The area of southwest Riverside County is served by television station Channel 27, broadcast from a hilltop in Murrieta.

Infrastructure

Transportation
Murrieta is served by two major Interstate highways: I-15 runs through the western portion of the city while I-215 runs through the eastern portion. Historic U.S. Route 395 (Jefferson Avenue/Ivy Street/Washington Avenue) passes through the city's downtown and State Route 79 (Winchester Road) defines much of the city's eastern border.

The Riverside Transit Agency (RTA)'s Routes 23, 61, 205, and 206 provide bus transit to Murrieta.

The French Valley Airport, used for general aviation, is located just east of the city limits.

The city may become host to the high-speed rail (HSR) that voters approved in 2008 with Prop 1A. The proposed HSR station is projected to handle 8,000 daily riders. The program-level HSR route alignment has placed this station between Murrieta and Temecula near the I-15 and I-215 freeway interchange.

Public safety

The Murrieta Fire Department was an all-volunteer fire department for 38 years. In 1987, it became a municipal fire protection district. It has been the city's primary paramedic service provider since 2000, and changed its name in 2017 to Murrieta Fire and Rescue. As of 2022, the department has five stations throughout the city, and operates a primary fleet of four type-1 engines, one quint-style truck, and two type-6 engines.

The Murrieta Police Department was founded in 1992. As of 2022, the department had about 100 sworn officers and approximately 50 support staff.

Hospitals
Murrieta is served by two hospitals: Loma Linda University Medical Center and Rancho Springs Medical Center.

Notable people

 Ambyr Childers, actress, raised in Murrieta
 Charlotte Rose Craig, Taekwondo Olympic Medalist in 2008
 Lindsay Davenport, professional tennis player and Olympic gold medalist, graduated from Murrieta Valley High School in 1994
 Rickie Fowler, professional golfer
 Tyler Glenn and Christopher Allen of Neon Trees
 Javelin Guidry, professional football player
 Ben Jackson, professional Major League Gaming player, originally from Murrieta
 Floyd Landis, disgraced cyclist, disqualified participant of the 2006 Tour de France, lives in Murrieta with his family when not racing or training
 Ryan Navarro, American football player, raised in Murrieta and played football at Vista Murrieta High School
 Inbee Park, professional golfer, winner of five LPGA major championships
 Tom Pernice Jr., professional golfer and two-time winner on the PGA Tour, lives in Murrieta
 Olivia Rodrigo, singer-songwriter and actress
 Kelly Seyarto, firefighter and politician, former mayor of Murrieta, member of the California State Assembly from the District 67
 Tyler Wade, Major League Baseball player 
 Tyree Washington, track athlete, world record holder in the 4×400 m relay and five-event IAAF World Championship gold medalist (1997, 2003 world; 2006 – world indoor)
 Patrick Wisdom, Major League Baseball player

See also

 Murrieta Hogbacks

Further reading

References

External links
 
 Murrieta Chamber of Commerce

 
1991 establishments in California
Cities in Riverside County, California
Elsinore Trough
Incorporated cities and towns in California
Populated places established in 1991